Sericoda ceylonica is a species of black coloured ground beetle from Platyninae subfamily. It was described by Victor Motschulsky in 1859 and is found in Japan, Philippines, and Sri Lanka.

References

Beetles described in 1859
Beetles of Asia